Ferdinando del Cairo (1666–1748) was an Italian painter of the Baroque period, active in Northern Italy.

Biography
He was born at Casale Monferrato, and learned the first rudiments of design from his father, an unknown artist. He afterwards became a pupil of Marcantonio Franceschini at Bologna. He painted history, and, in conjunction with Giacinto Garofalino, was employed to paint the ceiling of the church of Sant' Antonio at Brescia. He died at Genoa. He had an elder brother, Giuseppe (or Guglielmo) (1656–1682) who was also a painter.

References

1666 births
1748 deaths
People from Casale Monferrato
17th-century Italian painters
Italian male painters
18th-century Italian painters
Italian Baroque painters
Painters from Bologna
18th-century Italian male artists